Countess Michaela Saskia von Krockow, known professionally as Milla von Krockow, is a German fashion model. She placed seventh in the second season of the German competitive reality television series Germany's Next Topmodel.

Krockow is a member of the Von Krockow family, a noble Pomeranian family.

In 2007 Krockow was a contestant on the second season of Heidi Klum's reality television competition series Germany's Next Topmodel on the ProSieben network and came in seventh place. After the season ended, Krockow was signed with ProSieben's modeling agency for two years.

After her two-year contract with ProSieben ended, she signed with Louisa Models in Munich and Satory Model Management in Berlin. In 2007 Krockow was featured on the cover of Talbot Runhof and C&A. She also modeled in an advertisement campaign for Laux Design.

Krockow went to school for sociology, economic and social psychology, and marketing while modeling professionally. Upon finishing school, she began working in the marketing department of a publishing house in Göttingen.

References 

Living people
German countesses
German female models
Germany's Next Topmodel
Participants in German reality television series
Mass media people from Göttingen
Pomeranian nobility
Top Model contestants
Von Krockow family
1980s births
Royalty and nobility models